Paul Ingles (born August 7, 1956, in Washington, D.C.) is a radio producer, reporter, consultant, and filmmaker who has been working primarily in radio since 1975. Among other projects, he has produced a series of public radio music documentaries about the history of The Beatles which have been carried on scores of radio stations across the country. The programs include The Beatles In America - 1964, Everything Was Right: The Beatles' Revolver, The Two Sides of Sgt. Pepper: An Honest Appraisal, The White Album Listening Party, A Spin Down Abbey Road, Let It Be: The Beatles' Finale and The Last Year in the Life of The Beatles.

Ingles has also produced major public radio documentaries  on Bob Dylan, Joni Mitchell, Paul Simon, Bonnie Raitt, Linda Ronstadt, Otis Redding, Elton John, The Rolling Stones, and Shawn Colvin, as well as special tribute programs to Tom Petty, Aretha Franklin, Dr. John, Fats Domino, Chuck Berry, Leon Russell, Leonard Cohen, David Bowie, Prince, Glenn Frey, Guy Clark, Levon Helm, James Brown, Bo Diddley, and Clarence Clemons.  His work is archived at the Public Radio Exchange

He has been an active contributor to National Public Radio News  programs since 1999 and was NPR's Liaison to Independent Producers from 2006 through 2017.

He is co-creator, producer and host of the public radio series Peace Talks Radio, about peacemaking and nonviolent conflict resolution.

Paul's more recent focus on public radio work, beginning in 1994, returned him to his earliest days in radio.  In the fall of 1975, Paul began a 3-year stint as a student announcer at WFDD-FM, the public radio station affiliated with Wake Forest University, where Paul received his BA in English between 1974 and 1978.  At WFDD, Paul announced rock music programs on the station's Renaissance and Deaconlight programs and, with his classmate Lou Tilley, anchored WFDD's broadcast of sports events, including the station's production of Wake Forest football and basketball network broadcasts.  Paul also filed several reports for the fledgling National Public Radio news programs during his tenure at WFDD.

After graduation from Wake Forest in 1978, Paul's first commercial broadcasting work came as a news reporter for WAYS-AM radio and the Weekly Newspapers in Charlotte, North Carolina.  In 1979, he was hired as the city hall and general assignment reporter at WRET-TV, the NBC affiliate in Charlotte.  Toward the end of 1979, Paul accepted a position as a sports reporter at WBT-AM in Charlotte.  Before he started the position, WBT Sports Director Harold Johnson left WBT to anchor sports at television station WSOC in Charlotte, so Paul assumed the WBT Sports Director title on his first day of work.

Paul anchored morning and afternoon sports reports at WBT, initiated the station's WBT SPORTS HUDDLE talk program (1982) and reported live from the Master's golf tournament for the station (1980-1983), the Carolina Lightnin' ASL soccer championship game (1981), and shared broadcast duties on many other events with sportscaster Steve Martin, who was hired at WBT from Maine in 1982.  Ingles and Martin teamed up on two seasons of Davidson basketball broadcasts between 1982 and 1984.

Outside of his sports duties during his tenure at WBT, Paul was also often an active morning show team member with a series of hosts including Bob Lacey, Gary Craig, Spike O'Dell, and Pete Sullivan.  While working at WBT, Paul also hosted a weekly local reporters' round-table program at Charlotte's public television outlet WTVI, as well as anchoring a series of one-off sports broadcasts for WTVI.

Paul left WBT and WTVI in the fall of 1984 to take a position as Program Director and Morning Show host at WGSP-AM, a daytime-only, 1000 watt oldies radio station in Charlotte.  In the nearly 2 years at the station, Paul helped engineer a format shift from oldies to classic-rock early in 1985 that resulted in a significant ratings boost for the station.  After a couple of FM radio stations in the market also shifted toward classic-rock formats, WGSP was eventually sold by its owners and the entire staff was laid off in May 1986.

Paul moved to Albuquerque, New Mexico in the summer of 1986 and, over the course of 2 years there, worked as an announcer at KAFE-AM in Santa Fe (1986), as Promotions Director / Announcer / then Program Director for adult rock station KKBR-FM (1986-1987), and as a part-time announcer at album rock station KZRR-FM (1987-1988).

In the fall of 1988, Paul was recruited to become the Program Director at classic rock station WNCX-FM in Cleveland, Ohio where he helped improve the stations' ratings in the market from 1988 to 1990.  After a return to academia as a teachers' assistant while getting a master's degree in communications at Cleveland State University, Paul returned to Albuquerque in 1992.

Back in New Mexico, Paul worked a series of part-time announcing jobs at radio stations KLSK-FM, KMGA-FM, KQEO-AM, KZRR-FM, and KUNM-FM in 1992 and 1993.  In 1994, Paul accepted a full-time position as the Production Director at the NPR affiliate, KUNM-FM, at the University of New Mexico.  From 1994 to 2002, under his guidance, the station won numerous program production awards.

Paul retired from KUNM in early 2002 to begin the freelance production and reporting work that was described at the top of the page.  He continues to produce music programming and documentaries for public radio, and the PEACE TALKS RADIO series to this day.

References

External links
 www.paulingles.com 
 www.peacetalksradio.com 
 Albuquerque Journal Article on Peace Talks Radio 
 Paul Ingles' programs on the Public Radio Exchange 
 Paul Ingles' Reporting for National Public Radio 

American radio personalities
1956 births
Living people
People from Washington, D.C.